Pangilinan is a Filipino surname. Notable people with the surname include:

Candy Pangilinan (born 1972), Filipino film and television actress and comedian
Donny Pangilinan (born 1998), Filipino actor, model, singer, host and VJ
Francis Pangilinan (born 1963), Filipino lawyer and politician
Jaclyn Pangilinan (born 1986), Filipino-American swimmer, specialized in breaststroke events
Manuel V. Pangilinan (born 1946), Filipino businessman and sports patron
Maria Cecilia Laxa-Pangilinan (born 1970), known as Maricel Laxa, Filipino comedian and actress
Michael Pangilinan (born 1995), Filipino singer, actor, and model
Rafael Pangilinan Reavis (born 1977), known as Rafi Reavis, Filipino-American professional basketball player
Rich Pangilinan, known as DJ Riddler, American dance DJ, producer, remixer, music director, on-air personality
Rochelle Pangilinan (born 1982), Filipina dancer, actress and recording artist
Simone Francesca Emmanuelle Pangilinan (born 2000), known as Kakie, Filipino singer-songwriter

See also
Pangelinan

Tagalog-language surnames